Tomomichi is a masculine Japanese given name.

Possible writings
Tomomichi can be written using different combinations of kanji characters. Some examples:

友道, "friend, way"
友路, "friend, route"
友通, "friend, pass through"
知道, "know, way"
知路, "know, route"
知通, "know, pass through"
智道, "intellect, way"
智路, "intellect, route"
智通, "intellect, pass through"
共道, "together, way"
共路, "together, route"
朋道, "companion, way"
朋路, "companion, route"
朝道, "morning/dynasty, way"
朝路, "morning/dynasty, route"
朝通, "morning/dynasty, pass through"

The name can also be written in hiragana ともみち or katakana トモミチ.

Notable people with the name
, real name Tomomichi Kabetani (壁谷 友道), Japanese sumo wrestler
, Japanese samurai
, Japanese voice actor

Japanese masculine given names